King Township is a township in Polk County, Minnesota, United States. It is part of the Grand Forks-ND-MN Metropolitan Statistical Area. The population was 195 at the 2000 census.

King Township was named for Ephraim King, a pioneer settler.

Geography

Demographics
As of the census of 2000, there were 195 people, 76 households, and 56 families residing in the township.  The population density was 5.6 people per square mile (2.2/km2).  There were 82 housing units at an average density of 2.3/sq mi (0.9/km2).  The racial makeup of the township was 100.00% White.

There were 76 households, out of which 34.2% had children under the age of 18 living with them, 61.8% were married couples living together, 6.6% had a female householder with no husband present, and 26.3% were non-families. 25.0% of all households were made up of individuals, and 13.2% had someone living alone who was 65 years of age or older.  The average household size was 2.57 and the average family size was 3.11.

In the township the population was spread out, with 25.6% under the age of 18, 8.7% from 18 to 24, 23.1% from 25 to 44, 27.7% from 45 to 64, and 14.9% who were 65 years of age or older.  The median age was 40 years. For every 100 females, there were 116.7 males.  For every 100 females age 18 and over, there were 113.2 males.

The median income for a household in the township was $40,833, and the median income for a family was $57,500. Males had a median income of $27,083 versus $21,389 for females. The per capita income for the township was $21,211.  About 5.6% of families and 4.6% of the population were below the poverty line, including 12.1% of those under the age of eighteen and 5.1% of those 65 or over.

References

Townships in Polk County, Minnesota
Townships in Minnesota